is a railway station in the city of Kikugawa, Shizuoka Prefecture, Japan, operated by Central Japan Railway Company (JR Tōkai).

Lines
Kikugawa Station is served by the Tōkaidō Main Line, and is located 222.2 kilometers from the starting point of the line at Tokyo Station.

Station layout
The station has a single side platform serving Track 1 and an island platform serving Track 2 and Track 3, connected to the station building by a footbridge. Track 1 is used only during peak hours. The station building has automated ticket machines, TOICA automated turnstiles and a staffed ticket office.

Platforms

Adjacent stations

|-
!colspan=5|Central Japan Railway Company

Station history
Kikugawa Station was opened on April 16, 1889 when the section of the Tōkaidō Main Line connecting Shizuoka with Hamamatsu was completed. It was originally named . It was renamed Kikugawa on April 10, 1956. Regularly scheduled freight service was discontinued in 1971.

Station numbering was introduced to the section of the Tōkaidō Line operated JR Central in March 2018; Kikugawa Station was assigned station number CA26.

Passenger statistics
In fiscal 2017, the station was used by an average of 4,216 passengers daily (boarding passengers only).

Surrounding area
Kikugawa City Hall

See also
 List of Railway Stations in Japan

References

Yoshikawa, Fumio. Tokaido-sen 130-nen no ayumi. Grand-Prix Publishing (2002) .

External links

  

Railway stations in Japan opened in 1889
Railway stations in Shizuoka Prefecture
Tōkaidō Main Line
Stations of Central Japan Railway Company
Kikugawa, Shizuoka